The 2016 Competition102 GT4 European Series was the ninth season of the GT4 European Series, a sports car championship created and organised by the Stéphane Ratel Organisation (SRO). The season began on 23 April at Autodromo Nazionale Monza and finished on 9 October at Circuit Park Zandvoort after six race weekends.

Calendar
On 21 January 2016, the series announced the 2016 calendar.

Entry list
For the rounds held in conjunction with British GT, GT4 European Series contenders entered with their usual car numbers, but with 100 added up to it.

Race results
Bold indicates overall winner.

Championship standings

Scoring system
Points were awarded based on finishing positions as shown in the chart below. Entries were required to complete 75% of the winning car's race distance in order to be classified and earn points.

Monza, Pau, Hungaroring and Zandvoort

Silverstone and Spa-Francorchamps

Drivers' championship

Teams' championship

Notes

References

External links

GT4 European Series
GT4 European Series
GT4 European Series